Power of the Night is the second studio album by the American heavy metal band Savatage, released in 1985. This record was produced by Max Norman, who later went on to produce Megadeth's 1992 hit album Countdown to Extinction.

The record was not originally pressed with a Parental Advisory sticker on the cover. However, Atlantic Records did have a problem with some of the sexual metaphors mentioned in "Hard for Love" and "Skull Session." It was also a marketing ploy to encourage more people to buy the record as a result of it being "banned" by some outlets.

This was bassist Keith Collins's last album with the band. Jon and Criss Oliva were not completely happy with Collins' playing and corrected some of his mistakes for the final version. Collins was replaced by Johnny Lee Middleton in 1986.

Track listing

Personnel
Savatage
Jon Oliva – lead vocals & keyboards
Criss Oliva – guitars
Keith Collins – bass guitar
Steve Wacholz – drums

Production
Max Norman – producer, engineer
Ken Lonas – assistant engineer
Bob Defrin – art direction
Rick Smith – management
Robert Zemsky – management
Steven Machat – management

Charts

References

1985 albums
Albums produced by Max Norman
Atlantic Records albums
Savatage albums